The title Baron Percy has been created several times in the Peerage of England. The first, soon after 1066, a feudal barony rather than a barony by writ, which continued in parallel with the later baronies by writ, until the abolition of feudal tenure by the Tenures Abolition Act 1660. The second, created by writ in 1299, became extinct in 1517. The third, created by writ in 1557, became extinct in 1670. The present creation was in 1722, by writ of summons.

Barons Percy, feudal barons of Topcliffe, Yorkshire
 (died 1096).
Alan de Percy, 2nd Baron Percy (c. 1069–1135) (son).
William de Percy, 3rd Baron Percy (died 1174/5).
Agnes de Percy, Baroness Percy (1134–1205) (daughter and co-heiress) holder of a moiety of the barony. She married Joscelin de Louvain (d.c. 1180/9) who was granted the manor of Petworth by his sister (Adeliza of Louvain)'s second husband William d'Aubigny, 1st Earl of Arundel. 
Maud de Percy, Baroness Percy (died 1204) (daughter and co-heiress), holder of a moiety of the barony. She married William de Newburgh, Earl of Warwick (died 1184), without children.
Richard "de Percy", 5th Baron Percy (1166–1243) (younger son of Joscelin de Louvain by his wife Agnes de Percy). He adopted the surname de Percy, as did all his descendants. He was a signatory to Magna Carta.
William de Percy, 6th Baron Percy (1197–1245) (nephew, son of Henry de Percy (died 1198)).
Henry de Percy, 7th Baron Percy (1228–1272) (son).
John de Percy, 8th Baron Percy (died 1285/93) (eldest son).
Henry de Percy, 9th Baron Percy (1273–1314) (younger brother), in 1299 created by writ Baron Percy of Alnwick

Barons Percy (of Alnwick), second Creation (1299), by writ
Henry de Percy, 1st Baron Percy (1273–1314)
Henry de Percy, 2nd Baron Percy (1300–1351)
Henry de Percy, 3rd Baron Percy (1320–1368)
Henry Percy, 4th Baron Percy (1341–1408) (1377 created (1st) Earl of Northumberland)
see Earl of Northumberland (2nd to 7th)

Barons Percy (of Alnwick), third Creation (1557)
see Earl of Northumberland, 7th – 11th

Barons Percy, fourth Creation (1722)
This barony was created by error, when the 7th Duke of Somerset was called to Parliament in the barony Percy, which was believed to have been last held by his mother, Elizabeth. 
Algernon Seymour, 1st Baron Percy, 7th Duke of Somerset (1684–1750)
Elizabeth Seymour, 2nd Baroness Percy (1716–1776)
Hugh Percy, 3rd Baron Percy, 2nd Duke of Northumberland (1742–1817)
Hugh Percy, 4th Baron Percy, 3rd Duke of Northumberland (1785–1847)
Algernon Percy, 5th Baron Percy, 4th Duke of Northumberland (1792–1865)
John James Hugh Henry Stewart-Murray, 6th Baron Percy, 7th Duke of Atholl (1840–1917)
John George Stewart-Murray, 7th Baron Percy, 8th Duke of Atholl (1871–1942)
James Thomas Stewart-Murray, 8th Baron Percy, 9th Duke of Atholl (1879–1957)
Hugh Algernon Percy, 9th Baron Percy, 10th Duke of Northumberland (1914–1988)
Henry Alan Walter Richard Percy, 10th Baron Percy, 11th Duke of Northumberland (1953–1995)
Ralph George Algernon Percy, 11th Baron Percy, 12th Duke of Northumberland (b. 1956)

Notes

References

thePeerage.com website

Extinct baronies in the Peerage of England
Baronies created by error
Baronies by writ
Baron
Barons Percy
Peerages created for eldest sons of peers
Noble titles created in 1299
Noble titles created in 1557
Noble titles created in 1722